Agence Vu, (stylised as Agence VU and Agence VU') is a photography agency established in 1986 that has headquarters on Rue Saint-Lazare in Paris. It works with both photojournalists and art photographers, not specialising in one field of photography. It sells photographs, produces books, exhibitions and has a gallery called Gallery Vu (stylised as Gallery VU'). Xavier Soule is its president and director.

History
Agence VU was established by :fr:Christian Caujolle and :fr:Zina Rouabah in 1986. It is named after France's first illustrated magazine, Vu (stylised as VU), of the 1920s. It was sold in 1997 to Abvent group.

Members

Gallery VU'
Agence Vu has a gallery, Gallery Vu' (stylised as Gallery VU'), at the same location as the agency. It opened in 1998 and has six exhibitions each year.

Publications

Books
Agence VU, 15 ans. Martinière, 2001.
VU' à Paris. Panini, 2006. . French text. Preface by :fr:Christian Caujolle, text by Magali Jauffret, photographs by 18 Agence Vu photographers.
VU' à Orsay. Panini; Musée d'Orsay, 2006. . English and French text. Introduction by Serge Lemoine, text by Christian Caujolle, photographs by Gabriele Basilico, Rip Hopkins, Richard Dumas, Juan Manuel Castro-Pietro and Stanley Greene.
80+80 Photo_Graphisme. Paris: Filigranes; Aman Iman, 2006. . With Anatome graphic design agency.
Agence VU' Galerie. Arles, France: :fr:Actes Sud, 2006. . Photo Poche No. 107.
Circonstances particulières. Arles, France: Actes Sud, 2007. . By Christian Caujolle.
VU MAG. Aman Iman, 2009. .

VU' Mag
VU Mag. Paris: Filigranes, 2008. . Text by Eric Audinet, Christian Caujolle, Naxto Checa, Catherine Coleman, Gösta Flemming, Hélène Pinet and Cédric de Veigy.
VU Mag 2: Japon. Paris: Filigranes; Aman Iman, 2008. . Text by Anne Biroleau, Irène Attinger, Marc Feustel, Claude Leblanc, Manfred Heiting and Antonin Potoski.
VU Mag 3: au Cinéma. Paris: Filigranes; Aman Iman, 2009. . Text by Serge Daney, Serge Toubiana, Dytivon, David Marcilhacy, Christian Caujolle, Benoît Rivero, Richard Dumas and Stéphane Raymond.
VU Mag 4: émergence. Agence et Galerie VU'; Aman Iman, 2009. . Text by Amin Maalouf, Mustapha Chérif, Yasmine Eid-Sabbagh, Atiq Rahimi, Michael Onfray, Jean-Claude Carrière and Isabelle Eshraghi.
VU Mag 5 Collections. VU’ Editions; Aman Iman, 2010. . Text by Pierre-Alexis Dumas, Philippe Vayssettes, Aline Pujo, Pascal Ordonneau, François Lapeyre and others.

References

External links

Galerie VU'
La Boutique VU

Organizations established in 1986
1986 establishments in France
Photography companies of France
Photo agencies